Orero may refer to:

People
 Baldassarre Orero (1841–1914), Italian general
 José Sanfrancisco Orero (born 1944), Spanish painter, sculptor, poet and writer

Places
 Orero, Liguria, Italy
 Orero, Serra Riccò, Italy